Rutherglen Castle was located where Castle Street meets King Street in Rutherglen, Scotland. It was a large and important castle, having been built in the 13th century; the walls were reportedly 5 feet thick.

The castle fell under the control of the English during the First War of Scottish Independence and was later besieged several times by Robert The Bruce. It was eventually retaken by his brother Edward Bruce but was spared destruction, unlike so many of the other castles recaptured from the English. However, the castle was burned to the ground by James Stewart, 1st Earl of Moray, in 1569, in retribution against the Hamiltons of Shawfield for having supported Mary, Queen of Scots, at the Battle of Langside.

See also
 Farme Castle
 Castlemilk House

References

 Mason, Gordon. The Castles of Glasgow and the Clyde, Goblinshead, 2000

Castles in South Lanarkshire
Buildings and structures in Rutherglen
Former castles in Scotland
Buildings and structures completed in the 13th century
Buildings and structures demolished in the 16th century
16th-century disestablishments in Scotland
13th-century establishments in Scotland